This is a list of reigning non-sovereign monarchs, including traditional rulers and governing constitutional monarchs. Each monarch listed below reigns over a legally recognised dominion, but in most cases possess little or no sovereign governing power. Their titles, however, are recognised by the state. Entries are listed beside their respective dominions, and are grouped by country.

List of constituent Asian monarchs

Indonesia 
Present information regarding governmental recognition of traditional monarchs in Indonesia is inadequate. In some instances below, pre-colonial polities have been restored, and the royal titles of their leaders have been nominally confirmed. In other cases, the government has refused to revive monarchies that had been abolished during the earliest years of the republic. Despite the historical suppression of these dynasties, a large number have retained their culture, identity, and their status within their own communities. Royal titles are still widely used, bestowed in formal enthronement ceremonies conducted without formal recognition from Jakarta.

In recent years, the number of dynasties receiving recognition as nominal cultural authorities has steadily increased. However, because it remains unclear as to which monarchies have not yet been recognised, the list below will contain all extant Indonesian dynasties on which there is information available. Monarchs that have explicitly been denied recognition are listed under pretenders. The Sultan of Yogyakarta and the Duke of Pakualaman are listed separately due to the constitutional nature of their position.

Bali

Borneo

Java

Maluku

Papua

Roti

Sulawesi

Sumatra

Timor

Others

Malaysia

Philippines

United Arab Emirates

Notes

Indonesia

Malaysia

Philippines

United Arab Emirates

Others

See also
 Ethnarch
 List of monarchies
 Lists of monarchs
 Royal and noble ranks
 Traditional authority
 List of current constituent African monarchs
 List of current constituent Asian monarchs
 List of current constituent monarchs
 Lists of office-holders
 Heads of former ruling families
 Imperial, royal and noble ranks
 List of current monarchs of sovereign states
 List of current reigning monarchs by length of reign
 Monarchy
 Traditional authority
 Lists of office-holders
 Nobility
 Royal and noble ranks
 African royalty
 Royalty in the Americas
 Asian royalty
 European royalty
 Oceanian royalty
 Dynasties by continents
 Monarchs by continent
 Tribal chiefs

References

Further reading

Monarchs
Asian constituent